Ravi Sethi (born 1947) is an Indian computer scientist retired from executive roles at Bell Labs and Avaya Labs. He also serves as a member of the National Science Foundation's Computer and Information Science and Engineering (CISE) Advisory Committee.  He is best known as one of three authors of the classic computer science textbook Compilers: Principles, Techniques, and Tools, also known as the Dragon Book.

Sethi was born in 1947 in Murdana, Punjab. He attended the Indian Institute of Technology, Kanpur (IITK) and went on to obtain a Ph.D. at Princeton University. He worked as an assistant professor at Penn State University, before joining Bell Labs in 1976.

While working for Bell Labs he was awarded the "Distinguished Technical Staff award", and in 1996 he was named a Fellow of the Association for Computing Machinery. Also in 1996 he was named research vice president in charge of computing and mathematical sciences and, additionally, in 1997, chief technical officer for Lucent’s Communications Software Group.

In 2014, Sethi joined the department of computer science at the University of Arizona.

References

External links
Home page (University of Arizona)
Home page (Bell Labs)
Autobiographical note at Avaya website 
Publication list on DBLP

1947 births
Fellows of the Association for Computing Machinery
Indian computer scientists
Living people
Avaya employees
Scientists at Bell Labs
IIT Kanpur alumni
Princeton University alumni
People from Punjab, India